In mathematics, the term lattice group is used for two distinct notions:

 a lattice (group), a discrete subgroup of Rn and its generalizations
 a lattice ordered group, a group that with a partial ordering that is a lattice order